HaShem (Hebrew:  hšm, literally "the name"; often abbreviated to  [h′]) is a title used in Judaism to refer to God. It is also a given name and surname.

Religious usage 
 In Judaism, HaShem (lit. 'the Name') is used to refer to God, particularly as an epithet for the Tetragrammaton, when avoiding God's more formal title, Adonai ('my master').

People with the given name
Hashem Aghajari (born 1957), Iranian historian
Hashem Akbari (born 1949), Iranian-American professor at Concordia University
Hashem Akbarian (1897–1971), Iranian wrestler
Mirza Hashem Amoli (1899–1993), Iranian ayatollah
Hashem Beikzadeh (born 1984), Iranian footballer
M. Hashem Pesaran (born 1946), British-Iranian economist
Mohammad Hashem Taufiqui (born 1942), Afghan politician

People with the surname 
 Ibrahim Hashem (1888–1958), Jordanian lawyer and politician
 Nadia Hashem, Jordanian journalist and politician

Tribes with the given name 
 Banu Hashim (Arabic: بنو هاشم) arabic clan within the Quraysh tribe to which the prophet Muhammad belonged.

See also 
 Hashim
 Hasham (disambiguation)
 Hashemites
 Names of God in Judaism
 Asem

Arabic-language surnames
Arabic masculine given names
Iranian masculine given names
Names of God in Judaism